Telesom is a private telecommunication company established in 2002 by local entrepreneurs in Hargeisa, Somaliland. It is the leading provider of ICT services in the country and offers a wide range of products including voice and mobile broadband, fixed broadband, SMS, mobile money, mobile education, mobile infotainment and cloud offerings such as SaaS, IaaS and PaaS services.

Telesom was the first to introduce 2G, 3G and LTE services to the country, and played a significant role in rebuilding the country after the war by building a robust telecommunication infrastructure and enabling access to digital payments via its flagship mobile money platform ZAAD.

The company operates in the entire Somaliland, where it has the widest coverage network, and the company has affiliations with the neighboring countries biggest telecommunication companies and also shares the regional and international roaming service with them.

History
Founded in 2002 by local stakeholders, it became the first telecommunications company operating in Somaliland.

Dara Salam Bank
Dara-Salam Bank is a subsidiary of Telesom Company. The Dara-Salaam Bank was created in 2010, before its inception the bank was known as Salaam Financial Services.

Products and Services
 Mobile money transfer
 Mobile internet
 Landline

See also

 Ministry of Telecommunications and Technology (Somaliland)

References

External links
Telesom

Communications in Somaliland
Companies based in Hargeisa
Telecommunications companies of Somaliland
2002 establishments in Somaliland